Mathias Madsen (born 10 March 2002) is a Danish football player who plays as left back for Danish 2nd Division club Middelfart Boldklub.

Career

AC Horsens
Madsen joined AC Horsens at the age of 12. He was with the first team squad in Málaga, Spain, on training camp at the age of only 15 in January 2018. On 28 February 2018, AC Horsens announced that they had rewarded the player with a 3-year contract which included, that he was going to train with the first team squad once a week. Two months later, 21 April 2018, Madsen became the second youngest player in the Danish Superliga history to play, when he made his debut against F.C. Copenhagen. He was 16 years and 46 days old, which was only 8 days older than the youngest debutant ever, Kenneth Zohore, who was 16 years and 35 days old. He came on the pitch for the last couple of minutes, replacing Delphin Tshiembe.

He became a permanent player of the first team squad from the 2018/19 season. Madsen left Horsens at the end of the 2020-21 season, where his contract expired.

Middelfart BK
On 28 June 2021, Madsen joined Danish 2nd Division club Middelfart BK, signing a two-year deal.

References

External links

Mathias Madsen at DBU 

2002 births
Living people
Danish men's footballers
Danish Superliga players
AC Horsens players
Association football defenders
Denmark youth international footballers